Kevin Sinclair (born 23 November 1999) is a Guyanese cricketer. He made his international debut for the West Indies in March 2021.

Career
Sinclair made his List A debut on 7 November 2019, for the West Indies Emerging Team in the 2019–20 Regional Super50 tournament. He made his first-class debut on 16 January 2020, for Guyana in the 2019–20 West Indies Championship.

In July 2020, Sinclair was named in the Guyana Amazon Warriors squad for the 2020 Caribbean Premier League (CPL). He made his Twenty20 debut on 30 August 2020, for the Guyana Amazon Warriors in the 2020 CPL.

In February 2021, Sinclair was named in the West Indies' limited overs squads for their series against Sri Lanka. He made his T20I debut for the West Indies on 3 March 2021, against Sri Lanka. In August 2022, he was named in West Indies' ODI squad, for their series against New Zealand. He made his ODI debut on 17 August 2022, for the West Indies against New Zealand.

References

External links
 

1999 births
Living people
Guyanese cricketers
Guyana cricketers
Guyana Amazon Warriors cricketers
West Indies Emerging Team cricketers
West Indies Twenty20 International cricketers
West Indies One Day International cricketers
Place of birth missing (living people)